Marc-André Dorion (born March 30, 1987) is a Canadian professional ice hockey defenceman. He is currently playing with Black Wings Linz in the ICE Hockey League (ICEHL).

Playing career
Dorion played five seasons (2003–2008) in the Quebec Major Junior Hockey League (QMJHL) and was named to the QMJHL First All-Star Team for the 2007–08 QMJHL season. He went on to play four seasons of Canadian College hockey (2008–2012) with McGill University in the Quebec Student Sport Federation of Canadian Interuniversity Sport (CIS) where he graduated as McGill's all-time top-scoring defenceman with 192 points in 174 games.

For his outstanding play he was named three times to the CIS All-Canadian First Team (2009–10, 2010–11, and 2011–12) and was twice named CIS Defenceman of the Year (2009–10 and 2011–12).

After playing the first six seasons of his professional career with EHC Black Wings Linz, Dorion signed a one-year contract to continue in the EBEL with the Vienna Capitals on May 27, 2018.

Awards and honours

References

External links

1987 births
Living people
Acadie–Bathurst Titan players
Baie-Comeau Drakkar players
Canadian ice hockey defencemen
Dragons de Rouen players
EHC Black Wings Linz players
Ice hockey people from Quebec
Universiade medalists in ice hockey
Canadian expatriate ice hockey players in Austria
Universiade bronze medalists for Canada
Competitors at the 2011 Winter Universiade
Vienna Capitals players